Kjelvatnet may refer to:

Kjelvatnet (Ballangen), a lake in Ballangen municipality in Nordland county, Norway
Kjelvatnet (Fauske), a lake in Fauske municipality in Nordland county, Norway